A by-election for the seat of Bourke in the New South Wales Legislative Assembly was held on 6 September 1900 because of the resignation of William Davis, having been made bankrupt the previous day.

Dates

Result

William Davis resigned due to bankruptcy.

See also
Electoral results for the district of Bourke
List of New South Wales state by-elections

References

1900 elections in Australia
New South Wales state by-elections
1900s in New South Wales